Delincuente (in English: Delinquent) is a 1984 Mexican musical romance film. In this movie the writers aimed to please the fans of the co-stars Lucerito and Pedrito, since they had been unhappy that Lucerito's character had died in an earlier movie starring the two, Coqueta.

Synopsis  
Cecilia Suárez (Lucerito) poses for a portrait for a painter who is a friend of hers. One night this painter and a group of his friends go on a spree and meet Alejandro (Pedro Fernández) a young orphan who lives on the streets, so they decided to adopt him. Alejandro discovers the portrait and falls in love with Cecilia Suárez. He decides to meet her and tries to win her love, changing his manners and behavior, since she is a wealthy woman.

Cast 
 Lucero as Cecilia Suárez
 Pedro Fernández as Alejandro
 Nuria Bages as Cecilia's mother
 José Elías Moreno as Gonzalo
 Arturo Alegría
 Chico Che

External links

References 

1984 films
Mexican musical drama films
1980s Spanish-language films
Mexican romantic drama films
1980s Mexican films